Shadow Man is a 1988 film about a Polish-Jewish refugee during a fictional war in Amsterdam.

Premise
The story of a war refugee who's hiding in Amsterdam.

Cast

Production
The film was written and directed by Polish director Piotr Andrejew, recognized in Europe for his short movies, with the photography by Wit Dabal and the music by Edvard Grieg and Wim Mertens. A Dutch-British co-production in English, with some minor Dutch dialogue.

Patsy Kensit backed out one day before shooting; Manouk van der Meulen took over her role.

Honours
Nominated Golden Leopard for Best Film at the Locarno International Film Festival, Switzerland; 1989.
Opening Film Netherlands Film Festival, Utrecht, Netherlands; 1988.

External links

1988 films
1988 drama films
Dutch drama films